Calverton may refer to:

Places
 Calverton, Milton Keynes, United Kingdom
 Calverton, Nottinghamshire, United Kingdom
 Calverton, Maryland, United States of America
 Calverton, New York, United States of America
 Calverton, Virginia, United States of America

People
 V. F. Calverton (1900-1940), pen name of American writer and political activist George Goetz